Hecamede is a genus of shore flies (insects in the family Ephydridae).

Species

H. affinis Canzoneri & Meneghini, 1969
H. africana Mathis, 1993
H. albicans (Meigen, 1830)
H. australis Mathis, 1993
H. bocki Mathis, 1993
H. brasiliensis Cresson, 1938
H. globifera (Boheman, 1852)
H. granifera (Thomson, 1869)
H. grisescens Becker, 1903
H. maculipleuris (Meijere, 1914)
H. maritima Mathis, 1993
H. nuda Wirth, 1956
H. persimilis Hendel, 1913
H. planifrons (Meijere, 1913)
H. socotra Mathis, 1993
H. tomentosa Mathis, 1993

References

Ephydridae
Taxa named by Alexander Henry Haliday
Diptera of North America
Diptera of Europe
Brachycera genera